The Local Government Act 1929 was an Act of the Parliament of the United Kingdom that made changes to the Poor Law and local government in England and Wales.

The Act abolished the system of poor law unions in England and Wales and their boards of guardians, transferring their powers to local authorities. It also gave county councils increased powers over highways, and made provisions for the restructuring of urban and rural districts as more efficient local government areas.

Poor Law reform
Under the Act all boards of guardians for poor law unions were abolished, with responsibility for public assistance transferred to Public Assistance Committees of county councils and county boroughs. The local authorities took over infirmaries and fever hospitals, while the workhouses became public assistance institutions. Later legislation was to remove these functions from the control of councils to other public bodies: the National Assistance Board and the National Health Service.

The Metropolitan Asylums Board was also abolished, and the London County Council became responsible for its institutions.

Highways
County councils gained increased powers as the ultimate highway authority for all roads in the county. They acquired direct responsibility for all roads in the charge of rural district councils, as well as retaining control of roads classified by the Ministry of Transport. Urban district councils continued to be in charge of unclassified roads in their areas.

Adjusting local government areas
The 1929 Act sought to solve a problem that had arisen in the existing scheme of local government, with administrative counties divided into many small urban and rural districts. Some urban districts had a population of just a few hundred and did not have the resources to deliver modern local government services. Similarly, there were a number of rural districts created in 1894 that had small and irregular areas. There were also a few areas where parishes in one county were administered by a rural district council in another.

County review schemes and orders
Section 46 of the Act provided for a review of districts in each administrative county in England and Wales, with a view to forming more effective areas for administrative purposes. The process involved the putting forward of a scheme by the county council to which objections or representations could be made before an order was made by the Minister of Health. All county councils were required to finalise schemes by 1 April 1932, although the period could be extended at the minister's discretion. The final submission was by Cheshire County Council on 1 July 1935.

The first orders under the Act were made in 1932, and in November 1936 Robert Hudson, Parliamentary Secretary to the Minister of Health, was able to report that the process was nearly completed. The last order, affecting districts in the West Riding of Yorkshire, came into effect on 1 April 1938.  In the counties of Radnorshire and Rutland no changes were made to the existing structure.

The effects of the review orders made in the period 1932–1938 on the county districts was as follows:
189 boroughs extended
206 urban districts abolished and 49 created (a net decrease of 159)
236 rural districts abolished and 67 created (a net decrease of 169)

The Act did not allow for the abolition of municipal boroughs, so a number of small boroughs continued in existence. This power was later incorporated in the Local Government Act 1958.

At the same time as reorganising rural districts, many parishes within them were also amalgamated.

It was originally envisioned that reviews would be carried out every ten years, but the intervention of the Second World War and legislation in 1945 creating a Local Government Boundary Commission meant that there were no further large scale changes in administrative areas until the period 1965–1968.

See also
Administrative county
Local Government Act 1888
Local Government Act 1894

References
Local Government Act 1929

1929 in British law
United Kingdom Acts of Parliament 1929
Local government legislation in England and Wales
Acts of the Parliament of the United Kingdom concerning healthcare
Poor Law in Britain and Ireland
March 1929 events